Narmin Kazimova (born July 28, 1993) is an Azerbaijani Woman Grandmaster chess player.

She won the World Youth Chess Championship (Girls) in 2010.

She is a Woman Grandmaster (2015).

References

External links

Azerbaijani female chess players
Chess woman grandmasters
Living people
1993 births
World Youth Chess Champions